Shōriki may refer to:

Matsutarō Shōriki (1885–1965), Japanese baseball entrepreneur
Tōru Shōriki (1918–2011), Japanese baseball team owner
 

Japanese-language surnames